Lochranza is a village located on the Isle of Arran in the Firth of Clyde, Scotland. The population, somewhat in decline, is around 200 people.

Geography

Lochranza is the northernmost of Arran's villages and is located in the northwestern corner of the island. The village is set on the shore of Loch Ranza, a small sea loch. Ferries run from here to Claonaig on the mainland. The village is flanked to the northeast by the landmark hill Torr Meadhonach.

Geology
Lochranza has a field study centre, where schools from all over the UK come to study the locality's interesting geology and the nearby Hutton's Unconformity to the north of Newton Point, where the "father of modern geology" James Hutton found his first example of an angular unconformity during a visit in 1787.

Climate
Lochranza is reputed to have the fewest hours of sunshine of any village in the United Kingdom, and is the most shaded village in the entire world according to world climate experts , since it lies in a north-facing glen on an island with a particularly high level of rainfall. The streets do not have any street lights so it can be dark in the winter months.

Wildlife

The area around Lochranza Castle is a favoured spot to observe red deer, as the village is home to a healthy red deer population and, on the northern shore, grey seals are found year-round. Otters and golden eagles are also spotted in the area.

Economy
Formerly a herring fishing port, the village economy is now geared more towards tourism after the reopening of the pier in 2003. Lochranza Castle is a fine ruin of a 16th-century L-plan castle, across the road from the Lochranza youth hostel.

Lochranza is the site of the Arran Distillery, built in 1995 and producing the Arran Single Malt. The distillery is one of the major industries of the island. The bar of the Lochranza Hotel, to the north of the distillery, has one of the largest collections of Scotch whisky available by the measure in the country: over 350 different Scotch whiskies are available.

Lochranza has a golf course with eleven holes.

Transport 

A new pier was constructed in 2003, allowing larger vessels easier access with the possibility to disembark passengers for a short tour of the village. Regular vessels which use the pier include the paddle steamer Waverley and the Lord of the Glens, a small cruise ship.

Lochranza is on the 324 bus route between Brodick and Blackwaterfoot.

Culture
It is said that a local midwife once had an encounter with the Queen of the Fairies at Lochranza.

The village is also celebrated in verse:

Notes

External links 

 Aerial photograph of the bay
 Youth Hostel
Lochranza in 1882
Who owns Lochranza?
 Photo of the bay
Castle c.1890

Ports and harbours of Scotland
Villages in the Isle of Arran
Firth of Clyde
Parishes in the County of Bute